Jordan Valley Factory Estate was a factory estate in Jordan Valley, Ngau Tau Kok, Kowloon, Hong Kong, owned and managed by the Hong Kong Housing Authority. It was built in 1959. In 1983, its west wing was demolished to construct the new Ngau Tau Kok Bus Terminus. The remaining buildings were cleared in 2004 and demolished in 2005.

See also
 Manufacturing in Hong Kong
 Public factory estates in Hong Kong

References

Buildings and structures completed in 1959
Buildings and structures demolished in 2005
Ngau Tau Kok
Factory buildings in Hong Kong
Former buildings and structures in Hong Kong
1959 establishments in Hong Kong
2005 disestablishments in Hong Kong